Hong Junsheng, born in 1907, Henan Province, China, was a Chinese martial arts practitioner, teacher and author. Hong was the longest serving disciple for the Chen-style Taijiquan master Chen Fake (陈发科, 1887–1957). Starting in 1930, Hong trained uninterrupted with Chen for fifteen years.  In 1944, Hong moved to Jinan, Shandong Province.  In 1956, he returned to Beijing to study again with his teacher, Chen Fake. Hong, later, expressed his understanding of Chen Fake's teachings of the quan through his teachings and his writings.  The theories and training principles are now known as the Chen-style Taijiquan Practical Method  (Chén shì tàijí shíyòng quánfǎ).

Through the turmoil of the Cultural Revolution, Hong maintained his dedication to the enrichment of his art.  In the Era of Restructuring, Hong had trained a new generation of Chen stylists and wrote several articles to illuminate the mysteries of Chen-style Taijiquan.  As China opened up to the international community, Hong was rediscovered as an important linkage to this ancient Chinese martial arts tradition.  Taiji enthusiasts from all over the world would come to train with this remarkable man.  Fame and fortune did not change Hong. He remains steadfast to the ideals of the Tao.  Near the end of his life, old and in ill health, he would still maintain his daily t'ai chi training schedule and looked forward to doing Push hands with his students.  In 1996, in his 90th year (according to the Chinese calendar), Hong died.  Hong is survived by his family, his dedicated disciples and the lasting legacy of his Practical Method.

Training with Chen Fake (1930-1956)
Hong Junsheng was born in 1907, Yuxian County, Henan Province. His grandfather was a government official in the Qing Court. At an early age, Hong's family moved to Beijing.  Hong's family was affluent providing Hong with a leisurely life style and a classical Chinese education.  When Hong was young, he was physically weak and often sick. By the time Hong was seventeen, Hong could no longer continue his education because of his illness. Still feeling weak and sick even after getting married at the age of 20, Hong decided to improve his health by becoming more physically active.  He started by walking around the Beijing neighborhood and parks.  In 1930, Hong began to learn Wu-style Taijiquan from Liu Musan to further improve his health.  Liu, originally from Wuxi in Jiangsu Province, was the director of the Telegram Service Department at Beijing Telegram Bureau and a well regarded protégé of Wu Chien-ch'uan (吴鉴泉, 1870–1942). The taijiquan world was in flux, just as Hong started his training with Liu.

Before 1930, the public recognized taijiquan being taught by the Yang family and the Wu family, but the arrival of Chen Fake and his promotion of Chen-style Taijiquan radically changed this public perception.  Chen Fake had moved from Chen Village to Beijing to openly teach his family style.  In accordance with Chinese martial arts tradition, Chen accepted and won all challenges.  Chen's feats and exploits were widely reported in the press.  Liu decided to investigate the validity of those claims.  Liu invited Chen for a demonstration of the form as well as some friendly push hand competition.  Liu was impressed by Chen's ability and decided to lead his students including Hong to study Chen-style Taijiquan.
For the next fifteen years, Hong studied diligently under the careful guidance of Chen Fake.

Initially, Chen Fake lived with Hong because of Hong's affluence.  Hong was always the last student to receive personal instruction. This allowed Hong to closely observe the teachings of Chen and they would discuss Taijiquan occasionally throughout the course of the day.  Over time, Hong's health improved and this provided added impetus for Hong to continue his taijiquan training.  Even as his family responsibility increased with his six sons and as his fortune declined, Hong continued to train closely with Chen. Just as Hong's wealth waned, Chen's reputation was rising.  Chen invited Hong's family to stay with him. This allowed Hong once again to receive additional detailed instructions from Chen.  Over a thirty-year period, Chen Fake taught several hundred students in Beijing. Of those hundreds, only a handful can considered themselves to be disciples, Hong was one of the earliest of those disciples and studied with Chen the closest and longest.

In 1944, Hong's fortune continued to decline and he had to move from Beijing to Jinan, Shandong Province.  He would stay there for the rest of his life researching and practicing Chen-style Taijiquan according to the teachings of Chen Fake. He would meet his master just one more time.

In 1956, Hong was able to visit Beijing to train again with Chen Fake. In Jinan, Hong had practiced diligently and had researched the meaning of Chen-style Taijiquan and had many questions. Now, with his teacher, this was a time for review and answering questions. After reviewing every move, application and counter in the Yilu and Erlu, Hong's fundamental question was why the skills (gōng, 功) Chen Fake had taught him and the movements in the form (fǎ, 法) did not match exactly. He, then, asked if he could modify his form to unite the gōng (功) and fǎ (法) shown in the form Chen had taught him. Over the next several months, Chen and Hong worked daily on every move in the Yilu. When they had finished going through the Yilu, Chen Fake proclaimed. "This set of Taijiquan does not have one technique which is useless. Everything was carefully designed for a purpose" ("这套拳没有一个 动作是空的, 都是有用的”). They went through basic modifications in the Erlu, but Hong was summoned back to Jinan for a wedding, cutting the visit short. It was an intensive six months checking with his master on his interpretation and understanding of Chen style. At the end, Chen Fake told Hong that Hong's skill had reach a sufficient level and that Hong should now teach taijiquan.  (陈发科: “你的功夫已经达到了我所期望的水平，回去后，你可以教拳了。”)  Hong heeded his teacher's advice.  When Hong returned to Jinan, he started to teach earnestly Chen-style Taijiquan.  Just a year later, in 1957, Chen Fake died.  Hong was then one of the last links to the traditional Chinese martial arts as practiced in the previous century.

Preparing for the Dao under harsh conditions (1957-1975)
Hong's fate was deeply affected by the social turmoil that surrounded him.  No longer wealthy, unemployed and supporting a large family, Hong still persisted in his study of the Quan.  The tragedy of the Cultural Revolution (1966-1976) added to the hardship of Hong, persecuted for his bourgeois past, Hong was often left hungry, malnourished and struggled to provide for his family.

Despite those trying circumstances, Hong continued to teach his taijiquan. Slowly, he gathered a core group of dedicated students to experiment and test his understanding of Chen Style. In his spare time, he would write down his thoughts on this ancient art.  His single-minded devotion to the practice helped him to persevere under those trying circumstances.

Recognition of the Practical Method (1976-1996)
Hong's situation improved in the Era of Reconstruction.  The Chinese government and society no longer shunned its cultural heritage.  The public showed a renewed interest in taijiquan. Past martial arts masters could openly teach their art.  The Chinese government even sponsored demonstrations and exhibitions to reacquaint the public with the Chinese martial arts.  Hong, in general, avoided the public spotlight.  On the rare occasions that he made a public performance, the audience was treated to the Chen-style Taijiquan inherited from Chen Fake.  Though personally humble, Hong was proud of the achievements of his students.  When the government once again sponsored push hand competitions, the team trained by his student Li Enjiu surprised the country with their remarkable results.  First in provincial tournaments, then on the national stage, competitors from Jinan captured many gold medals.  Their success can all be attributed to the teachings of Hong.

As the memories of the Cultural Revolution faded, China reestablished relations with other countries such as Japan.  Japanese tourists were interested in the authentic martial arts heritage of China.  Their exploration took them all over China including Chen Village and then to Jinan.  Various Japanese martial arts associations discovered Hong training in his usual location near Black Tiger Spring.  They were impressed by his abilities through some impromptu test of skills. Those organizations started to organize regular tours to train with Hong and established t'ai chi clubs based on the teachings of Hong in Japan.  His visitors gave him the nickname “Tai Chi Super Star” and “Tai chi’s Magic Hand”  Eventually taiji enthusiasts from around the world came to train with Hong.  The Chinese government improved the living situation for Hong due to his increased popularity and the demand from foreign visitors.

In 1988, Hong finally compiled his twenty-one years of written notes into one comprehensive book – Chen Style Taijiquan Practical Method (陈式太极拳实用拳法, Chén shì tàijí quán shíyòng quánfǎ)  In this book, Hong described every technique in the Chen-style Taijiquan curriculum and tried to correct what he perceived as misinterpretations that are prevalent in taijiquan practice.  Using his expertise in traditional Chinese Poetry, he captured the essence of Chen-style Taijiquan in two poems that are known as the "Three-Character Canons (三字经)" and "The Quality of Tai Chi Chuan (太極拳品)". In 2006, portions of this book were translated into English by Hong's disciple, Chen Zhonghua.

In 1990, Hong suffered a stroke which left him paralysed from the waist down. Through sheer will power, Hong was still able to practice his quan even though he could no longer walk freely.  This he attributed to his daily taiji practice. He would continue to train with his students each day until his death in 1996.

An enduring legacy for Chen-style Taijiquan
Hong's legacy is his research and understanding of Chen-style Taijiquan as taught by Chen Fake.  This legacy can be seen in his disciples who are all well regarded taijiquan practitioners teaching Hong's Practical Method.  Amongst his multitude number of disciples include:
Li Zongqing (李宗慶; 1922 - 1993) originally trained in Ba ji quan.  He started his training with Hong in 1966.  He became Hong's teaching assistant and represented Hong in many functions including events in Japan.
He Shugan (何淑淦; b.1933) is one of the earliest students of Hong.  He started his training with Hong in the winter of 1950.  His students started the Heze Hung Junshen Chen-style t'ai chi ch'uan Research Association in 2011.
Han Baoli (韩保礼; b.1936) trained with Hong since 1960.  Han was one of Hong's assistants near the end of Hong's life.
Li Chugong (李储功; b.1936) is one of the main instructors still actively teaching the Practical Method in Jinan, Shandong, China. He became a student of Hong Junsheng in 1966 and stayed closely with him for nearly 30 years. He has written several articles and has produced video instructional materials on the Practical Method.  In 2007, he published a book on "实用太极拳对练" (The Practical Method Taijiquan Paired Training).
Ha Lezhi (哈乐之; b.1940) is an accomplished martial artists before dedicating his life in teaching and researching the Practical Method. He has taught t'ai chi ch'uan at many universities in Shandong Province.
Jiang Jiajun (蒋家骏; b.1942) is the honorary president of the Xuzhou Chen Style Taijiquan Research Association and the chief referee for a China Central Television program (CCTV) martial arts competition program ("“WMA • 武林大会联盟”").
Wang Jinxuan (王金轩; b.1942) is teaching the Practical Method in China.
Li Enjiu (李恩久;  b.1950) recognized by Hong family as the Standard Bearer for Hong’s Practical Method. He currently teaches in his own "Shandong Taiji Shangwu Club" in Jinan, China.
 Zhang Lianen (张联恩; b.1952) is the head of "Jinan Chen Style Taijiquan Association."
 Peter Wu Shi-zeng (吴仕增; b.1952) is teaching in Australia.
 Joseph Chen Zhonghua (陈中华; b.1961) recognized by Hong family as the International Standard Bearer for Hong's Practical Method.  He is based in Canada and Daqingshan (in Shandong, China).

Hong's understanding of Chen-style Taijiquan can be summarized in the first verse of his poem "Three-Character Canons":

which translates as:
 This revelation can be seen in the practice of the Practical Method of Chen Style Tai Chi Chuan according to the instructions of Hong Junsheng.

Taijiquan lineage tree with Chen-style focus 
Hong Junsheng can be seen as the 10 generation practitioner of Chen Style Taijiquan as shown on the Chen-style lineage tree. According to Hong, only direct descendants of the Chen family can considered themselves to be practitioners of Chen Family Taijiquan. All other Chen Taijiquan practitioners are Chen stylists as long as the principles unique to Chen style are observed. Some taijiquan practitioners refer to Hong's method as Hong style Taijiquan, Hong himself objected to such naming conventions.  He always insisted that he was merely a student of Chen Fake and was teaching according to his teacher's instructions. Hong used the term "Practical Method" (shíyòng quánfǎ) to emphasize the martial aspects of his research and training.

References

Chinese tai chi practitioners
Martial arts school founders
1907 births
Sportspeople from Shandong
Sportspeople from Henan
1996 deaths
20th-century philanthropists